Eccoptocera foetorivorans is a moth of the family Tortricidae. It was first described by Arthur Gardiner Butler in 1881. It is endemic to the Hawaiian islands of Kauai, Oahu, Molokai, Maui, Lanai and Hawaii.

The larvae have been recorded on Cheirodendron, Metrosideros, Psidium guajava and Sysygium sandwicensis. They feed amongst webbed-together leaves.

External links

Eucosmini
Endemic moths of Hawaii
Moths described in 1881